Caeneressa syntomoides is a moth of the family Erebidae. It was described by Rothschild in 1912. It is found on Borneo. The habitat consists of lowland forests.

References

Syntomini
Moths described in 1912